Strensall Halt railway station was a minor railway station serving the village of Strensall in North Yorkshire, England. It was situated on the York to Scarborough Line and was opened on 17 September 1926 by the London and North Eastern Railway. It closed on 22 September 1930.

The halt was located west of the level crossing of the LNER line with Moor Lane, south of the village.

References

Disused railway stations in North Yorkshire
Railway stations in Great Britain opened in 1926
Railway stations in Great Britain closed in 1930
Former London and North Eastern Railway stations